
Brolo (Sicilian: Brolu) is a comune (municipality) in the Metropolitan City of Messina in the Italian region Sicily, located about  east of Palermo and about  west of Messina.

Brolo borders the following municipalities: Ficarra, Naso, Piraino, Sant'Angelo di Brolo.

Until 1960 the economy was mostly based on agriculture, the main produces including olives and lemons. Now the economy is based on buildings houses, commerce and some summer tourism.

History
During the Roman era Brolo was called Brolium, meaning "garden" or "Park" in Latin, and was crossed by the Via Valeria. In the Middle Ages it had a castle on the sea, around which, probably from the 11th century, a fishermens' settlement arose. Bianca Lancia, mistress and wife of Emperor Frederick II of Hohenstaufen, probably lived in the castle during the 13th century according to some historians.

Brolo was the scene of an amphibious landing during the Battle of Sicily in World War II.

References

External links
 www.brolo.it/

Cities and towns in Sicily
Castles in Italy
Hilltowns in Sicily